Jürgen Koch (born 8 January 1973) is an Austrian badminton player from Askö Traun badminton club.

Career
Koch competed in badminton at the 1992 Summer Olympics in men's singles. He lost in the second round to Wong Wai Lap, of Hong Kong, 17-18, 15-6, 15-3. Koch played the 2007 BWF World Championships in men's singles, and was defeated in the first round by Anup Sridhar, of India, 21-15, 21-19. He won more than 20 titles at the Austrian National Badminton Championships.

References

External links

IBF Profile at www.internationalbadminton.org

1973 births
Living people
People from Traun
Austrian male badminton players
Badminton players at the 1992 Summer Olympics
Olympic badminton players of Austria
Sportspeople from Upper Austria